Johnnie Waterman (also known as Johnnie the Aquarius) is a 1994 Polish drama film directed by Jan Jakub Kolski. It was screened in the Un Certain Regard section at the 1994 Cannes Film Festival. It won the Findling Award in Cottbus.

Cast
 Franciszek Pieczka - Jancio Wodnik
 Grażyna Błęcka-Kolska - Weronka
 Bogusław Linda - Stygma
 Katarzyna Aleksandrowicz - Oczyszczona
 Olgierd Łukaszewicz - Dziad
 Wieslaw Cichy - Umarlak
 Renata Palys - Zona Umarlaka
 Henryk Niebudek - Chlop
 Malgorzata Kaluzinska - Czarnowlosa
 Kazimierz Krzaczkowski - Ojciec Oczyszczonej
 Katarzyna Kurylonska - Dziewczyna Stygmy
 Mariusz Kilian - Pastuch
 Lech Gwit - Socha
 Izabela Kwinta-Kolakowska - Wiejska Dziewczyna

References

External links
 

1994 films
1990s Polish-language films
1994 drama films
Films directed by Jan Jakub Kolski
Polish drama films